D3: The Mighty Ducks (also known as The Mighty Ducks 3) is a 1996 American sports comedy-drama film directed by Robert Lieberman. It is the third and final installment in The Mighty Ducks trilogy and was produced by Walt Disney Pictures and distributed by Buena Vista Pictures Distribution.

Plot
After their victory at the Junior Goodwill Games, youth ice-hockey team The Mighty Ducks and their captain Charlie Conway are awarded the junior varsity hockey scholarships to Eden Hall Academy, a prestigious Minneapolis-area prep school that Coach Bombay attended. Charlie struggles with his transition from childhood to adolescence; he thinks he was abandoned by Bombay when the latter informs him that he intends to take a job with the Junior Goodwill Games, which would leave him unable to coach the Ducks; one of the Ducks' enforcers, Dean Portman, also decided not to attend the school after hearing about Bombay's leaving and Jesse Hall also does not attend. Bombay informs Charlie prior to the start of classes that the team will be in good hands under the coaching of former NHL player Ted Orion.

The Ducks' start at the school begins inauspiciously; while the newer Ducks respectfully sit in at the headmaster's speech, the original teammates crash the ceremony on stage. The team then experiences many early struggles: playing in Coach Orion's new "two-way hockey" defensive style, Orion abandoning several Duck traditions and some of their youthful in-game 'trick' plays, losing Adam Banks who qualifies for Varsity, and off-ice conflicts with the Varsity team. The Ducks' struggles continue, culminating in a tie in their first game after having a huge lead. Eventually, when Coach Orion restricts the old Ducks uniform after an unsanctioned early morning match with the Varsity team to settle their differences, where Orion sternly declares "The Ducks are dead.", Charlie decides to leave the team to return to public schools and seek a hockey career. Fulton follows, but considers quitting hockey much to Charlie's dismay. Sometime later, he ultimately returns to the team without Charlie.

Angry at Bombay's departure and at Orion's highly disciplined coaching style, Charlie's acting out alienates him from his mother, Hans (Gordon's old mentor and friend of the Ducks), and even his friends. Hans suddenly dies, and Bombay comes to Charlie's house the day after the funeral and takes him back to Eden Hall. He tells Charlie that Orion's career with the Minnesota North Stars ended when the team moved to Dallas and he stayed to care for his paraplegic daughter. Bombay tells Charlie the background story on how he first came to coach the Ducks and says he told Orion that Charlie was the heart and soul of the team, and it was his hope that both Orion and Charlie would learn something from each other. Bombay also admits telling Orion that Charlie was the real "Minnesota Miracle" man. Emotionally touched by his words, finding new resolve, and feeling guilt-ridden over how he acted against Orion, Charlie agrees to rejoin the team. By most fans, Conway is considered the heart and soul of the team, but Adam Banks is the better all around player.

Arriving at the team bus for the next game, Charlie tells Orion he wants to play "two-way hockey". Surprised but pleased, Coach Orion welcomes him back. Before they depart, Dean Buckley, the school's headmaster, informs the team that its board of trustees wants to revoke the Ducks' scholarships and offers Orion a chance to start anew with a team of his choice. Satisfied with the team, Orion balks at the news, threatening resignation. At a board meeting the following day, Bombay, who was an experienced lawyer before coaching the Ducks, acts as the Ducks' attorney and fights successfully for their case, threatening the board with an injunction and promising to win the resulting lawsuit if the board expels the Ducks, and the board reinstates the Duck's scholarships with much reluctance due to Bombay putting them in a no-win situation. The Varsity are furious that the Ducks won't be expelled, but agree to a wager with the Ducks regarding the JV-Varsity match: If the Warriors win, the Ducks are expelled, but if the Ducks win, the team name will be changed to the "Mighty Ducks".

Prior to the annual JV–Varsity game, Orion brings back the Duck jerseys, giving the team a renewed vigor. Throughout the game, the Varsity dominates on offense. However, the Ducks play good defense and manage to keep the game scoreless after two periods. During the second intermission, Dean Portman returns to the team (having finally accepted his scholarship), adding a needed spark. Late in the game, the Ducks get two penalties and must play 5 vs 3. During the time-out, Orion reinstates Charlie as captain and tells him to go for the win if the opportunity presents itself. With seconds left in the game, Charlie gets a breakaway and beats all the defensemen and goalie; he passes the puck back to Goldberg, now a defenseman, who scores into a wide-open net as time expires, securing a 1–0 victory for the Ducks.

Following the victory, Charlie embraces Orion and spots Bombay who has attended the game, and they both look across the rink to a newly-presented Eden Hall banner with the Ducks' logo, as the Varsity lost the wager, leaving them to depart the ice in humiliated defeat. Bombay then departs the game amid a sea of cheering fans, with a smile.

Cast

Cameo appearance
Paul Kariya, captain of the Mighty Ducks of Anaheim (now Anaheim Ducks) when the film was released, makes a cameo appearance during the second intermission of the Ducks/Varsity Warriors game.

Departure
Brandon Adams, who played Jesse Hall, is the only actor from the previous films to not reprise his role as a Duck, after appearing in the first two films of the trilogy. It's assumed his character moved away.

Production
The third movie originally was going to be darker in tone and the main antagonists were originally going to be Bulgarians.
The character of Jesse Hall, played by Brandon Adams in the first two films and a fan favorite, was in the original script for this movie. His role was severely diminished with minimal lines and screen time compared to the first two films. Parts of the movie were filmed at Carleton College in Northfield, Minnesota.

Reception

Box office
The movie debuted at No.4 in the box office and ended up grossing $22,936,273 in the US. It is the lowest-grossing film of the trilogy.

Critical
Like its predecessor, the film received negative reviews, and holds a 20% 'rotten' rating based on 15 reviews with an average rating of 3.8/10 on review aggregate Rotten Tomatoes. John Anderson of the Los Angeles Times called the film "a self-reverential salute to Ducks" while also saying that the film was "lazier" than its predecessors. Steve Hedgpeth of the Newark Star Ledger wrote, 'Somebody put this stupid Disney franchise in Deep-Freeze'. Roger Ebert of the Chicago Sun Times wrote that "D3: The Mighty Ducks is a truly dreadful film, a lifeless, massive, childish exercise in failed comedy". Gene Siskel of the Chicago Tribune called it "dull, stupid, brainless, and dim-witted".

Home video release
The film was released on VHS on January 21, 1997, on DVD on September 2, 2002 and was also released on Blu-ray disc as a Disney Movie Club exclusive on May 23, 2017. It was also released on the Disney+ streaming platform on September 4, 2020.

References

External links

 
 
 
 
 D3: The Mighty Ducks Original screenplay by Jim Burnstein

1996 films
1990s sports comedy-drama films
The Mighty Ducks
Walt Disney Pictures films
Films set in Minnesota
American children's comedy films
American sports comedy-drama films
American sequel films
Films shot in Minnesota
American ice hockey films
Films with screenplays by Steven Brill
Films directed by Robert Lieberman
Films scored by J. A. C. Redford
1990s English-language films
1990s American films